Carabus batangicoides is a species of ground beetle in the Carabinae subfamily that is endemic to Sichuan, China.

References

batangicoides
Beetles described in 2011
Beetles of Asia
Endemic fauna of Sichuan